Two local elections were held in North Korea in 1956. Town, neighborhood, village, and workers' district people's assembly elections were held on November 20, with 54,279 deputies elected. Provincial, city, county, and district people's assembly elections were held on November 27, with 1,009 provincial people's assembly deputies and 9,364 city and county people's assembly deputies elected.

Voter turnout was reported as 100%, with candidates receiving a 100% approval rate.

References

1956 in North Korea
1956 elections in Asia
Local elections in North Korea